Coroner Creek is a 1948 American Western film directed by Ray Enright and starring Randolph Scott and Marguerite Chapman. It was based on the novel of the same name by Luke Short.

Plot
After his fiancée is abducted from a stagecoach and ends up dead, Chris Danning rides into the town of Coroner Creek seeking the man responsible.

Hotel owner Kate Hardison asks him to escort home Abbie, the inebriated wife of rich rancher Younger Miles, but his motives are mistaken and Chris is beaten by Younger's men. A widow, Della, tells him that Younger is trying to drive her off her land, and Chris begins to believe Younger could be the man he's after.

Younger and his men kill a friend of Chris's and the sheriff as well, also setting a fire that leads to Della losing all her cattle. A showdown ensues and Chris’s defeats Younger and returns to town and to a possible romance with Kate.

Cast
 Randolph Scott as Chris Danning
 Marguerite Chapman as Kate Hardison
 George Macready as Younger Miles
 Sally Eilers as Della Harms
 Edgar Buchanan as Sheriff O'Hea
 Barbara Reed as Abbie Miles
 Wallace Ford as Andy West
 Forrest Tucker as Ernie Combs
 Joe Sawyer as Frank Yordy
 William Bishop as Leach Conover
 Russell Simpson as Walt Hardison
 Douglas Fowley as Stew Shallis
 Lee Bennett as Tip Henry

References

External links
 
 
 
 

1948 films
1948 Western (genre) films
American Western (genre) films
Films based on American novels
Films based on Western (genre) novels
American films about revenge
Films directed by Ray Enright
Cinecolor films
Columbia Pictures films
1940s English-language films
1940s American films